Pionk is a surname. Notable people with the surname include:

Neal Pionk (born 1995), American professional ice hockey player
Richard Pionk (1936–2007), American artist

See also
Pink (surname)